Pichipoo is a 1978 Indian Malayalam-language film, directed by P. Gopikumar. The film stars P. Bhaskaran, Sukumari, Kaviyoor Ponnamma and KPAC Lalitha. The film's score was composed by Jaya Vijaya. The film was a remake of the Tamil film Bhadrakali.

Cast
P. Bhaskaran 
Sukumari 
Kaviyoor Ponnamma 
KPAC Lalitha 
Sukumaran 
Vidhubala 
Bhavani

Soundtrack
The music was composed by Jaya Vijaya with lyrics by P. Bhaskaran.

References

External links
 

1978 films
1970s Malayalam-language films
Malayalam remakes of Tamil films
Films directed by P. Gopikumar
Films scored by Jaya Vijaya